Sean Michael Dee Anthony (born January 26, 1986) is a Filipino-Canadian professional basketball player for the NLEX Road Warriors of the Philippine Basketball Association (PBA). He was drafted sixth overall in 2010 by the Air21 Express but was immediately shipped to the Powerade Tigers on draft night. In his rookie year, he won the Rookie Sophomore Blitz game MVP.

College career
Sean Anthony finished his varsity career at McGill where he was a physical education major. At McGill, Anthony had a reputation as a defensive stopper and slasher.

Professional career
After two seasons with the Tigers, he was then traded to Barako Bull Energy Cola on 2012 PBA draft night in exchange for Aldrech Ramos, who was the 5th pick by Barako Bull.

After a season with Barako Bull, he was again traded to Talk 'N Text in exchange for Jared Dillinger.  And just recently, before the end of the 2013–14 PBA Philippine Cup elimination round, he was traded again along with Eliud Poligrates and a 2016 first-round pick to Air21 Express in exchange for Niño Canaleta.

On September 12, 2014, he was sent to Meralco Bolts in a three-way trade involving NLEX Road Warriors and Blackwater Elite. NLEX obtained Blackwater's 2016 and 2017 2nd round pick along with the draft rights for Juneric Baloria. Blackwater received Sunday Salvacion and Jason Ballesteros.

On September 30, 2015, Anthony was traded by the Meralco Bolts to the Mahindra Enforcer for 2016 and 2017 2nd round picks and then he was immediately traded to the NLEX Road Warriors for Juneric Baloria & 2016 2nd round pick. On October 28, 2015, Anthony scored 11 points and grabbed a career-high 19 rebounds in a 93–85 win over his former team, the Barako Bull. In a game against TNT, he had a career-high 32 points.

On October 14, 2016, Anthony was recognized during the PBA Leo Awards Night as he was named to the PBA Mythical Second Team.

In the 2017 Commissioner's Cup, Anthony was traded with Bradwyn Guinto for draft picks to the GlobalPort Batang Pier in a four-team trade. He debuted for GlobalPort with 18 points. In the 2019 Philippine Cup, he had 7 steals to go with his 22 points and 9 rebounds in a win against NLEX. He finished that season with Defensive Player of the Year and was named to the Mythical First Team. During the 2020 PBA season, he had a triple-double against Phoenix.

On November 5, 2021, Anthony, along with Sean Manganti, was traded to the Phoenix Super LPG Fuel Masters for Vic Manuel and Michael Calisaan.

On January 18, 2023, Anthony was traded back to the NLEX Road Warriors in a three-team trade involving NLEX, Phoenix, and TNT Tropang Giga.

PBA career statistics

As of the end of 2022–23 season

Season-by-season averages

|-
| align=left | 
| align=left | Powerade
| 21 ||	19.6 || .421 || .233 || .618 || 5.4 || 1.7 || .7 || .2 || 7.6
|-
| align=left | 
| align=left | Powerade
| 48 || 25.0 || .383 || .283 || .642 || 6.3 || 2.4 || 1.1 || .1 || 9.1
|-
| align=left | 
| align=left | Barako Bull
| 33 || 23.3 || .423 || .333 || .699 || 5.1 || 1.9 || .9 || .1 || 9.0
|-
| align=left rowspan=2| 
| align=left | Talk 'N Text
| rowspan=2|23 || rowspan=2|21.4 || rowspan=2|.417 || rowspan=2|.309 || rowspan=2|.762 || rowspan=2|5.0 || rowspan=2|.9 || rowspan=2|.9 || rowspan=2|.1 || rowspan=2|8.6
|-
| align=left | Air21
|-
| align=left | 
| align=left | Meralco
| 40 || 21.2 || .363 || .255 || .680 || 5.3 || 1.9 || 1.0 || .1 || 7.2
|-
| align=left | 
| align=left | NLEX
| 35 ||	31.8 || .465 || .287 || .704 || 9.2 || 2.4 || .8 || .1 || 15.0
|-
| align=left rowspan=2| 
| align=left | NLEX
| rowspan=2|31 || rowspan=2|27.5 || rowspan=2|.403 || rowspan=2|.319 || rowspan=2|.669 || rowspan=2|8.8 || rowspan=2|2.5 || rowspan=2|1.0 || rowspan=2|.2 || rowspan=2|11.4
|-
| align=left | GlobalPort
|-
| align=left| 
| align=left | GlobalPort / NorthPort
| 33 || 31.8 || .421 || .356 || .700 || 8.4 || 3.8 || 2.0 || .4 || 16.3
|-
| align=left| 
| align=left | NorthPort
| 35 || 33.6 || .410 || .291 || .759 || 7.6 || 3.8 || 2.4 || .3 || 16.4
|-
| align=left| 
| align=left | NorthPort
| 4 || 28.0 || .357 || .316 || .710 || 8.5 || 5.5 || 1.8 || .0 || 14.5
|-
| align=left| 
| align=left | NorthPort
| 8 || 24.5 || .394 || .185 || .778 || 6.8 || 2.1 || 1.5 || .0 || 10.6
|-
| align=left rowspan=2| 
| align=left | Phoenix
| rowspan=2|26 || rowspan=2|23.6 || rowspan=2|.428 || rowspan=2|.365 || rowspan=2|.606 || rowspan=2|5.9 || rowspan=2|2.6 || rowspan=2|1.2 || rowspan=2|.0 || rowspan=2|10.2
|-
| align=left | NLEX
|-class=sortbottom
| align=center colspan=2 | Career
| 337 || 26.2 || .412 || .307 || .693 || 6.8 || 2.5 || 1.2 || .1 || 11.2

References

1986 births
Living people
Air21 Express players
Barako Bull Energy draft picks
Barako Bull Energy players
Basketball players from Vancouver
Canadian men's basketball players
Canadian sportspeople of Filipino descent
Citizens of the Philippines through descent
Filipino men's basketball players
McGill Redmen basketball players
Meralco Bolts players
NLEX Road Warriors players
NorthPort Batang Pier players
Phoenix Super LPG Fuel Masters players
Power forwards (basketball)
Powerade Tigers players
Small forwards
TNT Tropang Giga players